

Medalists

Qualification

Qualification rule: qualification standard 6.60m or at least best 8 qualified

Final

Long jump at the World Athletics Indoor Championships
Long Jump Women
2008 in women's athletics